The 2017 Auto Club 400 is a Monster Energy NASCAR Cup Series race  that was held on March 26, 2017, at Auto Club Speedway in Fontana, California. Contested over 202 laps, extended from 200 laps due to overtime, on the  D-shaped oval, it is the fifth race of the 2017 Monster Energy NASCAR Cup Series season.

Report

Background

It is also used for open wheel racing events. The racetrack is located near the former locations of Ontario Motor Speedway and Riverside International Raceway. The track is owned and operated by International Speedway Corporation and is the only track owned by ISC to have naming rights sold. The speedway is served by the nearby Interstate 10 and Interstate 15 freeways as well as a Metrolink station located behind the backstretch.

Entry list

First practice

Qualifying
I knew everybody was running the top in 3 and 4 and my plan was to go up there in the second round, but thought I maybe got through 1 and 2 okay enough to run the bottom. I knew the third round I was going to have to move up. Our Target Chevy was really good, really balanced up there. I was surprised."

Qualifying results

Practice (post-qualifying)

Second practice

Final practice

Race

First stage
Kyle Larson led the field to the green flag at 3:50 p.m. On the initial start, Denny Hamlin spun his tires and forced Brad Keselowski to check up. He backed into Ryan Newman – and Kevin Harvick, who was lined up behind Newman – and was turned up the track, damaging the left-rear quarter panel in the process. Keselowski kept going, but got loose exiting Turn 4, with help from Jimmie Johnson, and spun through the frontstretch grass, bringing out the first caution of the race on the third lap.

The race restarted on the eighth lap. Harvick made an unscheduled stop for damage on lap 23. A cycle of green flag stops started on lap 30 and resulted in Martin Truex Jr. cycling to the lead. Larson took it back exiting Turn 4 on lap 49, won the first stage and the second caution flew for the completion of the stage on lap 60. Truex exited pit road first. Ryan Blaney (removing equipment from the pit box) and Austin Dillon (speeding) restarted the race from the tail end of the field for pit road infractions.

Second stage
The race restarted on lap 68. The second stage was only broken up by green flag stops on lap 91, which resulted in Truex retaining the lead. It ended with him winning the stage and the third caution flew on lap 120 for its completion.

Final stage

The race restarted with 73 laps to go. Larson powered by Truex on the bottom in Turn 1 to retake the lead on the restart. For most of the stage, it was a repeat of the second stage. It was broken up with 49 to go when cars started pitting under green, Larson and Truex pitted together with 45 to go and Larson regained it with 37 to go. During the cycle, Kyle Busch led for a few laps, followed by Ty Dillon and Johnson was turned by Truex on pit road. Gray Gaulding suffered a right-front tire blowout and slammed the wall in Turn 1, bringing out the fourth caution with 20 to go. Truex, who entered pit road under the caution second, left seventh after he "stopped too deep in the box."

The race restarted with 16 to go. Exiting Turn 2 on the restart, Truex hooked the left-rear corner of Matt Kenseth, then sent him spinning down the track and into the inside retaining wall, bringing out the fifth caution.

The race restarted with 11 to go. Two laps later, Corey LaJoie spun out in Turn 2, bringing out the sixth caution. Hamlin, taking the lead as a result, Truex and Jamie McMurray elected to stay out under the caution, while everyone else hit pit road.

The race restarted with five to go. Larson quickly took second from Truex on the backstretch and had a run on Hamlin, but found himself boxed in by Truex to his left and the outside wall to his right. He made the pass for the lead exiting Turn 2 with three to go seconds before the seventh caution flew for Ricky Stenhouse Jr. spinning out in Turn 2.

Overtime
The race restarted in overtime with two to go and Larson drove on to score the victory.

Post-race

Driver comments
In victory lane, Larson said of the final two restarts that he was "staying as calm as [he] could," but he was "frustrated" as well. "It seems like every time I get to the lead at the end of one of these things, the caution comes out and I've got to fight people off on restarts," he added. "Our Target Chevy was amazing all day. We were able to lead a lot of laps today. Truex was better than us that second stage by quite a bit. We were able to get the jump on him the following restart and led pretty much the rest of the distance. I had to fight them off there after the green flag stops (before the final caution), and that was a lot of fun. This is just amazing. We've been so good all year long, three seconds in a row. I've been watching all the TV like 'He doesn't know how to win,' but we knew how to win today, so that was good."

"Great perseverance from this team," Keselowski said on pit road after rallying from a Lap 3 spin to finish runner-up. "I got out of the car and looked at the damage. It's torn to pieces. I feel lucky to finish second and curious what we could have done if we weren't torn up. Great day for us to persevere, despite adversity. You'll have that in a 36-race season, so proud of team for that."

Clint Bowyer, who earned his first top-five finish since the 2015 Irwin Tools Night Race with a third-place finish, said his team is "getting closer. This is a good track for me. I wanted to win that damn thing, but to come home with a wild finish and everything that it was, we’ll take it.”

Truex, who finished fourth after electing not to pit under the penultimate caution, said it was "not the situation we wanted to be in, but we thought more guys would stay out there. I think we only ran a few laps. It was definitely a disadvantage at the end and just really tight. Holding on for fourth was good for points.”

Race results

Stage results

Stage 1
Laps: 60

Stage 2
Laps: 60

Final stage results

Stage 3
Laps: 82

Race statistics
 Lead changes: 8 among different drivers
 Cautions/Laps: 7 for 29
 Red flags: 0
 Time of race: 2 hours, 57 minutes and 46 seconds
 Average speed:

Media

Television
The race was the 17th race Fox Sports covered at the Auto Club Speedway. Mike Joy, three-time Auto Club winner Jeff Gordon and Darrell Waltrip had call in the booth for the race. Jamie Little, Vince Welch and Matt Yocum will handle the pit road duties for the television side.

Radio
MRN had the radio call for the race which was also simulcasted on Sirius XM NASCAR Radio. Joe Moore, Jeff Striegle and 2001 race winner Rusty Wallace called the race from the booth when the field was racing down the front stretch. Dan Hubbard called race from a billboard outside turn 2 when the field was racing through turns 1 and 2. Kurt Becker called the race from a billboard outside turn 3 when the field was racing through turns 3 and 4. Alex Hayden, Winston Kelley and Steve Post worked pit road for MRN.

Standings after the race

Drivers' Championship standings

Manufacturers' Championship standings

Note: Only the first 16 positions are included for the driver standings.

References

Auto Club 400
Auto Club 400
Auto Club 400
NASCAR races at Auto Club Speedway